Grauer Bär (Italian: Orso Grigio) is a traditional hotel in South Tyrol with origins dating back to 1300. It is located in the historic center of Innichen town in Italy.

See also 
List of oldest companies

References 

Hotels in Italy
Restaurants in Italy
Tourist attractions in South Tyrol
13th-century establishments in Italy